Mathieu is both a surname and a given name. Notable people with the name include:

Surname
 André Mathieu (1929–1968), Canadian pianist and composer
 Anselme Mathieu (1828–1895), French Provençal poet 
 Claude-Louis Mathieu (1783–1875), French mathematician and astronomer
 Émile Léonard Mathieu (1835–1890), French mathematician
 Gail D. Mathieu, United States ambassador to Namibia
 Georges Mathieu (1921–2012), French painter
 Jérémy Mathieu (born 1983), French footballer
 Luc Mathieu (born 1972), French journalist
 Marie-Alexandrine Mathieu (1838–1908), French artist known for her etchings
 Michel Mathieu (disambiguation), multiple people, including:
Michel Mathieu (Canadian politician) (1838–1916), Canadian politician
Michel Mathieu (French politician) (1944–2010), French diplomat
 Mireille Mathieu (born 1946), French singer
 Paul-Henri Mathieu (born 1982), French tennis player
 Simonne Mathieu (1908–1980), French tennis player
 Tyrann Mathieu (born 1992), American football player
 W. A. Mathieu (born 1937), composer, musician, and educator

Given name
 Mathieu Amalric (born 1965), French actor and filmmaker
 Mathieu Beaudoin (born 1984), Canadian ice hockey player
 Mathieu Beaudoin (Canadian football) (born 1974), Canadian football player
 Mathieu Betts (born 1995), Canadian-American football player
 Mathieu Biron (born 1980), Canadian hockey defenceman
 Mathieu Bois (born 1988), Canadian breaststroke swimmer
 Mathieu Debuchy (born 1985), French footballer 
 Mathieu Flamini (born 1984), French footballer
 Mathieu Greco (born 2004), French American
 Mathieu Kassovitz (born 1967), French director, screenwriter, producer, editor, and actor
 Mathieu Kérékou (born 1933), President of Benin
 Mathieu Lafon (born 1984), French footballer
 Mathieu Ladagnous (born 1984), French road racing cyclist
 Mathieu Lemay, Canadian politician in Quebec
 Mathieu Montcourt (1985–2009), French tennis player
 Mathieu de Montmorency (1767–1826), French statesman during the French Revolution
 Mathieu Orfila (1787–1853), Spanish-born French toxicologist and chemist
 Mathieu van der Poel (born 1995), Dutch cyclist
 Mathieu Raynal (born 1981) French rugby union referee
 Mathieu Schneider (born 1969), American hockey defenseman
 Mathieu Valbuena (born 1984), French footballer

See also
 Matthieu
 Matthew (name)
 Mathieu function, special function useful for treating a variety of interesting problems in applied mathematics
 Mathieu transformation, subgroup of canonical transformations in classical mechanics.
 Mathieu groups, a family of five sporadic simple groups

French masculine given names
Surnames from given names